A by-election for the seat of West Macquarie in the New South Wales Legislative Assembly was held on 2 July 1884 because of the resignation of Thomas Hellyer.

Dates

Candidates
 Lewis Lloyd was a copper miner and justice of the peace who did not initially canvass the electorate and only came forward when Charles Pilcher withdrew.

 Charles Pilcher was the former member for West Macquarie before standing unsuccessfully for East Sydney in 1882. He withdrew prior to the nominations.

 William Richardson was a commission agent from Sydney who was supported by the Protection and Political Reform League and Richard Luscombe, the newly elected member for Northumberland, was active in his campaign. He had previously stood unsuccessfully for The Hastings and Manning in 1880 and  The Hunter in 1882.

Result

Thomas Hellyer resigned.

See also
Electoral results for the district of West Macquarie
List of New South Wales state by-elections

References

1884 elections in Australia
New South Wales state by-elections
1880s in New South Wales